Łukasz Kubot and Marcelo Melo were the defending champions and successfully defended their title, defeating Oliver Marach and Fabrice Martin in the final, 4–6, 6–3, [13–11].

Seeds

Draw

Draw

Qualifying

Seeds

Qualifiers
  Guillermo Durán /  Mariusz Fyrstenberg

Qualifying draw

External links
 Main draw
 Qualifying draw

Erste Bank Open - Doubles
2016 Doubles
Erste Bank Open Doubles